Bloodthorn is a Norwegian black metal band from Trondheim.

History
Founded in 1992, they have gone through a number of musical developments. For example, their album Under The Reign Of Terror (2001) saw the band abandoning the female vocals (by Christine Hjertaas) and keyboards (by Geir Mikael Reijners) that had been so prominent on the first two albums and going back to their roots of raw, extreme metal. In 2006, Bloodthorn released their fourth album, Genocide.

Following the release of Genocide, Bloodthorn played at several festivals, including Inferno and Wacken Open Air 2006 as well as Hole in the Sky 2007, and did a European and Scandinavian tour, with Carpathian Forest and Vader respectively.

Bloodthorn is now working on their fifth album for a 2009 release.

Discography
 Natteskyggen (demo 1996)
 In the Shadow of Your Black Wings (CD 1997/LP 1998)
 WAR Vol. I (1998, split with ...and Oceans)
 Onwards Into Battle (CD 1999)
 Under the Reign of Terror (CD/LP 2001)
 Genocide (CD 2006/LP 2007)

External links
 Official website

Norwegian death metal musical groups
Musical groups established in 1992
1992 establishments in Norway
Musical quintets
Musical groups from Trondheim
Season of Mist artists